The National Taiwan University Hospital (NTUH) is a medical facility located in the Zhongzheng District of Taipei, Taiwan. It started operations under Japanese rule in Daitōtei (today's Dadaocheng) on 18 June 1895, and moved to its present location in 1898. The hospital was later annexed to the Medical School of Taihoku Imperial University in 1937. The present name was adopted in 1945 upon its affiliation with National Taiwan University.

On 19 October 1991, a large new building complex on the so-called East Site was completed. The (new) East and (old) West Sites together have more than 4,000 employees, serving 2,000 inpatients and 8,000 outpatients daily. Advanced surgical, angiographical, and endoscopic procedures are routinely performed.

Heart Transplant Division
The NTUH Heart Transplant is a staple part of National Taiwan University Hospital. It has performed numerous successful heart transplants since the founding of the hospital in 1895.

Despite its relatively young start, the Heart Transplant Division performed its first successful heart transplantation in 1986. Not only was it the first heart transplant in NTUH, but it was also the first heart transplant in all of Taiwan. Since then, it has expanded rapidly. In 1991, NTUH performed their first domino heart transplant. Later in 1995, NTUH was the first in all of Asia to implant biventricular-assist devices which were then bridged successfully into a heart transplant.

Transportation
The hospital is accessible within walking distance East from NTU Hospital Station of the Taipei Metro.

See also
 Museum of Medical Humanities
 Healthcare in Taiwan
 List of hospitals in Taiwan

References

External links
 

Hospitals established in 1895
1895 establishments in Taiwan
Hospital buildings completed in 1898
Hospital buildings completed in 1991
Teaching hospitals in Taiwan
Hospitals in Taipei
Hospital